= Tche Tche =

Café

TCHE TCHE café
- Company type: Private
- Industry: Coffeehouse, Casual dining
- Founded: 1998 in Amman, Jordan
- Headquarters: Amman, Jordan
- Area served: Jordan, UAE, Kuwait, Egypt, Palestine, Oman, Saudi Arabia, Iraq, Lebanon
- Products: Hot beverages, cold beverages, food, hookah
- Revenue: $150 million
- Number of employees: 750
- Website: tchetchecafe.com

Tche Tche café (stylized as TCHETCHE) is an Amman, Jordan-based coffeehouse chain. It started as a small cafe in Amman, Jordan in 1998, and became so popular that it grew to 28 outlets spread all over the Middle East region. As Jordan's most popular cafe and casual dining chain, Tche Tche is the first Jordanian cafe to successfully expand regionally. Today TCHE TCHE has branches in Dubai, Abu Dhabi, Kuwait, Egypt, Oman, and Iraq in addition to the thirteen existing outlets in Jordan.

== Overview ==
TCHE TCHE café operates as a cafe in Amman. It offers breakfast, snacks, salads, sandwiches, grilled pasta, pizzas, desserts, hot drinks, and cold drinks. The company was founded in 1998 and is based in Abu Dhabi, United Arab Emirates. It has branches in Jordan, the United Arab Emirates, Kuwait, Egypt, Palestine, Oman, Kingdom of Saudi Arabia, Iraq, and Lebanon.

TCHE TCHE is one of the leading restaurant chains in the region.

There are more than 32 branches of TCHE TCHE located throughout the Middle East, including an outlet in Ramallah, "a favourite spot" among Palestinian youth.

== Locations ==
As of March 2026, TCHE TCHE has 45 outlets in ten countries.

- Egypt (1 outlets)
- Iraq (7)
- Jordan (2)
- Saudi Arabia (1)
- Kuwait (2)
- Lebanon (1)
- Oman (2)
- Palestine
- UAE (5)
- Qatar (4)
